Serdika II Metro Station is an M2 line station of Sofia Metro.  It was put into operation on August 31, 2012 and the station became transfer station between the Red and Blue lines together with Serdika, however it is not a true transfer station (that role is filled by Obelya), but a tunnel-connection transfer station. Bulgaria's PM Boyko Borisov and  the President of the European Commission Jose Manuel Barroso inaugurated the new section of the Sofia Metro, which was funded with EU money. The initial project name of the Metro Station was Sveta Nedelya Square, but this was changed by the city council shortly before the opening of M2 line.

Public Transportation
Bus service: N1, N3, N4
Tramway service: 4, 12, 18, 20, 22

Location
The station is located in the heart of the city beneath the Largo complex. It is named after the ancient city of Serdica, as it lies in the very centre of the hitherto unearthed ruins of that city.

Gallery

References

External links

 Sofia Metropolitan
 More info in Bulgarian
 SofiaMetro@UrbanRail
 Sofia Urban Mobility Center
 Sofia Metropolitan

Sofia Metro stations
Railway stations opened in 2012
2012 establishments in Bulgaria